Gabriel Kyeremateng (born 28 April 1999) is a German professional footballer who plays as a forward for Swiss club FC Thun.

Club career
Kyeremateng started playing football in his hometown at local team Eintracht Dortmund. In 2007, he joined the youth academy of Borussia Dortmund and moved through the youth teams of the club. He played 29 games for the Dortmund U17 team in the Under 17 Bundesliga and 43 games for the Dortmund U19 team in the Under 19 Bundesliga. He also made 10 appearances in the UEFA Youth League.

In 2018, Kyeremateng joined Stoke City, playing for their U23 team in Premier League 2 Division 2. In his two years at Stoke, he made 32 appearances and scored 14 goals for the reserve team. In October 2020, he moved to Swiss Challenge League club FC Thun.

International career 
Kyeremateng was born in Germany and is of Ghanaian descent. He has played for the German junior national teams at the U15, U16 and U18 levels.

References

External links
 
 

1999 births
Living people
German footballers
German expatriate footballers
Expatriate footballers in England
German expatriate sportspeople in England
German sportspeople of Ghanaian descent
Association football forwards
Swiss Challenge League players
FC Thun players
Footballers from Dortmund